Richard Michael John Hely Hutchinson, 8th Earl of Donoughmore (born 8 August 1927) is an Irish peer, styled Viscount Suirdale from 1948 until 1981.

The son of John Hely-Hutchinson, 7th Earl of Donoughmore (12 November 1902 – 1981), and Dorothy Jean Hotham (12 August 1906 – 29 December 1995), he succeeded to his father's titles in 1981 and sat in the House of Lords under the Viscountcy of Hutchinson (a title in the Peerage of the United Kingdom). Due to the House of Lords Act 1999 he lost his seat.

Donoughmore was educated at Winchester, Groton School (Massachusetts) and  New College, Oxford, graduating with a medical degree and later gaining the rank of captain in the service of the Royal Army Medical Corps.

Family

Lord Donoughmore's first wife was Sheila Parsons, daughter of Frank Parsons and Jean Falconer. From this marriage he has four children. Lady Donoughmore died in 1998, and Lord Donoughmore married Margaret Stonehouse in 2003. He lives in Oxfordshire. He is the father of the publisher Tim Hely Hutchinson, the painter Nicholas Hely Hutchinson, and Mark Hely Hutchinson, former CEO of Bank of Ireland.

See also
Hely-Hutchinson v Brayhead Ltd (1968); 1 QB 549

References
thepeerage.com

External links

1927 births
Alumni of New College, Oxford
Groton School alumni
People educated at Winchester College
Royal Army Medical Corps officers
Living people
People from Oxfordshire
People from Clonmel
Richard
Earls of Donoughmore
Donoughmore